E. Mahoney and Son was an architectural business consisting of Edward Mahoney (1824 or 1825 – 28 April 1895) and his son and architectural partner, Thomas Mahoney (1855–1923), who were prominent New Zealand architects based in Auckland. They were able exponents of Gothic Revival and other styles, especially built in wood, but also in masonry and concrete. They designed numerous public (especially churches, notable examples of which are Church of St John the Baptist, Parnell, St Patrick's Cathedral, Auckland and the Church of the Holy Sepulchre, Khyber Pass Road and private buildings, many of which are still standing. They made a considerable contribution to Auckland's architectural heritage.

References

Irish architects
New Zealand ecclesiastical architects
New Zealand people of Irish descent
People from Auckland
1824 births
1825 births
1855 births
1895 deaths
1923 deaths
New Zealand Roman Catholics
19th-century New Zealand architects
Architecture firms of New Zealand
People educated at St Peter's College, Auckland
Gothic Revival architects